Jason Logan is an illustrator, writer, graphic designer, and art director based in Toronto, Ontario, Canada. His illustrations have appeared in numerous publications including The New York Times, The Walrus, and The Globe and Mail. His first book, If We Ever Break Up, This Is My Book has been translated into seven languages. Logan has also created hand-lettering and designed book covers for Coach House Books and HarperCollins.

Works

{| class="wikitable"
|-
! style="background:#B0C4DE;" | Year
! style="background:#B0C4DE;" | Title
! style="background:#B0C4DE;" | Publisher 
|-
|2005
|If We Ever Break Up, This Is My Book
|Simon & Schuster
|-
|2007
|iGeneration
|Penguin Canada
|-
|2010
|Festus
|J&L Books
|-
|2018
| Make Ink:A Forager's Guide to Natural Inkmaking
| Abrams Books
| 

|}

References

External links
Jason Logan's official website
Artist Spotlight by Julia Hendrickson
"If We Ever Break Up, This Is My Book" on Google Books
Quill and Quire review of If We Ever Break Up, This Is My Book
Official site for iGeneration

Canadian illustrators
Living people
Year of birth missing (living people)